The 1993 Virginia Slims of Houston was a women's tennis tournament played on outdoor clay courts at the Westside Tennis Club in Houston, Texas in the United States that was part of Tier II of the 1993 WTA Tour. It was the 23rd edition of the tournament and was held from March 22 through March 28, 1993. Third-seeded Conchita Martínez won the singles title and earned $75,000 first-prize money.

Finals

Singles
 Conchita Martínez defeated  Sabine Hack 6–3, 6–2
 It was Martínez' 2nd singles title of the year and the 13th of her career.

Doubles
 Katrina Adams /  Manon Bollegraf defeated  Eugenia Maniokova /  Radka Zrubáková 6–3, 5–7, 7–6(9–7)

External links
 ITF tournament edition details
 Tournament draws

Virginia Slims of Houston
Virginia Slims of Houston
Virginia Slims of Houston
Virginia Slims of Houston
Virginia Slims of Houston
Virginia Slims of Houston